The Women's Super-G competition of the Albertville 1992 Olympics was held at Meribel on Tuesday, 18 February.

The defending world champion was Ulrike Maier of Austria, while France's Carole Merle was the defending World Cup Super-G champion, and shared the lead in the current season with Heidi Zeller.

Deborah Compagnoni of Italy won the gold medal, Merle took the silver, and Katja Seizinger of Germany was the bronze medalist. Maier was fifth, downhill champion Kerrin Lee-Gartner was sixth, and Zeller was eleventh. The winning margin was 1.41 seconds; through 2018, it remains the largest in the event's Olympic history.  On the same day at Val-d'Isère, compatriot Alberto Tomba successfully defended his men's giant slalom title.

Results
The race was started at 12:15 local time, (UTC +1).

References

External links
Results
FIS results

Women's Super-G
Alp
Olymp